Aechmea corymbosa is a plant species in the genus Aechmea. This species is native to Venezuela, Colombia, Peru, Brazil and Ecuador.

References

corymbosa
Flora of South America
Plants described in 1830